Kalpana Swaminathan (born 1956) is an Indian writer from Mumbai. She also writes with Ishrat Syed as Kalpish Ratna.  Swaminathan and Syed are both surgeons. Swaminathan won the 2009 Vodafone Crossword Book Award (Fiction) for Venus Crossing: Twelve Stories of Transit.

Bibliography
1993: The True Adventures of Prince Teentang
1994: Dattatray's Dinosaur and Other Stories
1997: Cryptic Death
2000: Ordinary Mr Pai Two Urban Fairy Tales 
2002: The Weekday Sisters
2002: Gavial Avial
2003: Ambrosia for Afters
2003: Jaldi's Friends
2006: The Page Three Murders
2006: Bougainvillea House
2007: The Gardener's Song
2009: Venus Crossing: Twelve Stories of Transit 
2010: The Monochrome Madonna
2012: I Never Knew It Was You
2013: The Secret Gardner
2017: Greenlight

Awards and honors
2009: Vodafone Crossword Book Award, winner, Venus Crossing
2010: The Hindu Best Fiction Award, shortlist, Venus Crossing

References

External links
 Experimental Writer, by Sitanshi Talati-Parikh, Verve Online, September 2007
 Black, White, and Grey: Exclusive interview with 'The Monochrome Madonna' author Kalpana Swaminathan, by Arun Kale, Helter Skelter Magazine, June 2010

English-language writers from India
Living people
1956 births